Hamoud bin Abdulaziz Al Saud (1947 25 February 1994) was a Saudi royal and businessman. He was reportedly the thirty-sixth and youngest son of the founder of Saudi Arabia, King Abdulaziz.

Biography
Prince Hamoud was born in 1947. He was the only child of Fatima Al Yamania, a concubine hailing from Yemen, and King Abdulaziz. He was the youngest living son of King Abdulaziz for all 47 years of his life: from his birth in 1947 until the birth of his half-brother Jiluwi in 1952, and again from his brother's death that year until his death in 1994. 

He was a businessman and had a trade company named Gada Marketing and Trading based in Jeddah which was established in 1978. He had one daughter, Princess Gada. Prince Hamoud died at age 47 on 25 February 1994. Some sources say that he died in Saudi Arabia while talking with King Fahd.

Ancestry

References

Hamoud
1947 births
1994 deaths
Hamoud